Suzanne Vega is the debut studio album by American singer-songwriter Suzanne Vega, released on May 1, 1985, by A&M Records. It was well-received by music journalists in the U.S.  and reached platinum status in the United Kingdom. Produced by Lenny Kaye and Steve Addabbo, the songs feature Vega's acoustic guitar in straightforward arrangements. A video was released for the album's song "Marlene on the Wall", which went into MTV and VH1's rotations.

In 1989, Rolling Stone magazine listed Suzanne Vega at number 80 on its "100 Best Albums of the Eighties". It is also mentioned in the book 1001 Albums You Must Hear Before You Die.

Track listing
All tracks written by Suzanne Vega.

Side one

 "Cracking" – 2:49
 "Freeze Tag" – 2:36
 "Marlene on the Wall" – 3:40
 "Small Blue Thing" – 3:54
 "Straight Lines" – 3:49

Side two

 "Undertow" – 3:26
 "Some Journey" – 3:38
 "The Queen and the Soldier" – 4:48
 "Knight Moves" – 3:36
 "Neighborhood Girls" – 3:21

Personnel
Credits adapted from the album liner notes:
Suzanne Vega – vocals, acoustic guitar
Steve Addabbo — background vocals (4, 5, 7), synclavier guitar (6), 12-string acoustic guitar (8), electric guitar (10)
Darol Anger – electric violin (7)
Frank Christian – acoustic guitar (2, 9), electric slide guitar (10)
Paul Dugan – bass (1, 4, 6, 8, 9), vertical bass (2)
Sue Evans – drums (3, 5, 6, 10), percussion (4, 10)
Jon Gordon – electric guitar (1–7)
Peter Gordon – string arrangement (6)
Frank Gravis – bass (3, 5, 10)
Shem Guibbory – violin (6)
Mark Isham – synthesizers (7)
John Mahoney – synclavier programming (6)
Maxine Neuman – cello (6)
C.P. Roth – synthesizers (1–5, 9), piano (8), organ (8)
Roger Squitero – percussion (7)

Charts

Weekly charts

Year-end charts

Certifications and sales

References

Bibliography

 

1985 debut albums
A&M Records albums
Albums produced by Lenny Kaye
Albums produced by Steve Addabbo
Suzanne Vega albums